Kolhorn (West Frisian: Klòrre(n)) is a village in the Dutch province of North Holland.

History 
The village was first mentioned in 1518 as Kolhoiren, and may mean "cold corner". Kolhorn is a dike village which developed in the 14th century on a sharp corner of the sea dike. During the 18th century, the economy was based on fishing and peat transport. The village was destroyed by fire in 1788.

The Dutch Reformed is a single aisled church with a lean tower. It was originally from the 15th century, but burnt down in 1788. It was restored between 1791 and 1792. The pub De Roode Leeuw dates from 1620, but received its current shape in the 19th century.

Kolhorn was home to 551 people in 1840. After the poldering, the village is now situated land inwards, but has retained the appearance of a fishing village.

Notable people 
  was born on Kolhorn

Gallery

References

External link

Populated places in North Holland
Hollands Kroon